is a fictional character in Capcom's Street Fighter  fighting game series. He first appears as a playable character in Street Fighter III: 2nd Impact. He is a member of a secret society known as The Illuminati, which is led by his older brother Gill. The character also appears in the crossover video game Capcom Fighting Evolution, and Street Fighter V as a post-launch DLC character. Urien is  well received.

Character design and appearances
Within series lore, Gill and Urien are the children of gifted parents who excelled physically and intellectually. The Illuminati separated the brothers from their birth parents at the age of six and gave them a specialized education to become candidates for the organization's presidency. Gill was ultimately chosen, leaving Urien bitter with resentment. In 2nd Impact, Urien challenges Gill for the presidency. He eventually gains the title, only to learn that Gill has been promoted to Emperor, the true leader of the Illuminati, whose existence is known only to its presidents and chairmen. In 3rd Strike, in spite of his new position, Urien still resents the supremacy of his brother. He decides to eliminate Gill permanently and destroys the preservation facility where Gill is still recovering. During the character introduction that precedes every match in Street Fighter III, he is presented as wearing business attire prior to the beginning of his fight, where shortly afterwards his skin darkens and his clothes disappear, leaving him wearing only a white loincloth like Gill.

In Street Fighter V, he is one of six characters released as part of the game's season 1 DLC content following the game's launch in February 2016, though he is briefly available as a playable character in Street Fighter V's story mode A Shadow Falls, which was released in June 2016 as part of a free update. Capcom staff considered this to be a free preview of the character before he is officially released in competitive game modes in September 2016. In the game's story mode, which is set before the events of Street Fighter III, Urien is still the Vice President of the Illuminati and plots to usurp control of the organization from Gill, and eliminate Shadaloo as a potential rival. He is portrayed as a tyrannical and elitist leader who has sadistic and violent tendencies, and has "complete confidence in his own physicality".

For Street Fighter V, Urien is redesigned with a full pinstriped suit as his default appearance, a look akin to a mafia enforcer. Game director Takayuki Nakayuma explained that Urien received a makeover as a "clothes-free, Renaissance-statue look" does not suit the serious tone of the game's story. An easter egg implemented by the developers allow players to change Urien to his classic look through a specific combination of input commands during the character's pre-fight introduction: Urien radiates destructive energy that burns off the entirety of his clothing except for his loincloth underwear, with the alternate battle mode outfit keeping his long hair and the alternate story mode outfit keeping his shades. 

Urien also appears in Capcom Fighting Evolution as one of the characters representing the Street Fighter III series.

Gameplay
In the Street Fighter III series, Urien share several moves with Gill, the point of difference being that much of the input motions for performing the shared techniques are different for Urien, and he does less damage compared to Gill. Instead of having control over fire and ice like Gill, Urien can transmute his body into iron form, and has the ability to manipulate electricity. Urien’s most notable ability is the Aegis Reflector, which creates moving plasma walls capable of reflecting projectile attacks. 

In Street Fighter V, Urien's Aegis Reflector is activated via the character's V-Trigger input, which creates an energy barrier in front of him: it reflects projectiles produced by both normal attacks and Critical Art combination attacks, and also damages and knocks back opponents if they come into contact without blocking. With a full V-meter, Urien can create two barriers. These moving barriers are considered to be a fundamental feature of Urien’s gameplay, which allows a player to operate defensively, trap opposing players, and create juggle opportunities when paired with his other attacks. The tactical opportunities presented by the Aegis Reflector ability enables a skilled player to control the pace of a match. A defense-oriented ability activated by Urien's V-Skill input grants the character the ability to shrug off one hit. He has been described as a versatile character, whose moveset combines the traits of a "motion" character as some of his special moves are triggered by fast, circular inputs, and a "charge" character whose special moves require the directional input to be momentarily pinned in a specific direction before the start of the move.

Reception
Gavin Jasper from Den of Geek placed Urien 34th place in a ranking list of Street Fighter characters, noted that his role as a disgruntled underling plotting to usurp his brother calls into question who is the true main villain of the Street Fighter III series. As Urien is essentially a head and palette swap of Gill's in-game model and gameplay mechanics, Jasper praised the developers of 2nd Impact for successfully differentiating both characters by applying select variations to Gill's moveset and visual design to create Urien. Ian Walker from Kotaku noted that Urien was popular with players in both casual and competitive spheres of Street Fighter III due to his distinct look and abilities. In September 2016 Wesley Yin-Poole from Eurogamer observed that Urien quickly became a fan favorite after he was made available earlier that month for download, which he attributed to the character's powerful Aegis Reflector ability, and said he looked forward to see how the character would be utilized by professional players. Urien is placed at 52nd in a worldwide Street Fighter character poll held between 2017 and 2018. 

For professional level play in Street Fighter V, Urien is consistently regarded as one of the most powerful characters in the roster since his debut in September 2016. Initial impressions and metagame analysis by professional fighting game players with regards to Urien's introduction into the game was generally positive. A balance update implemented in early 2017 doubles the damage dealt by Aegis Reflectors and increases the corresponding meter accumulation earned by certain moves, making Urien's plasma walls easier to activate: this resulted in an increased number of Urien players in high-level competition ever since, such as February 2017’s Winter Brawl XI where half of the finalists played Urien at least once in their top eight matches. Naoki ‘Nemo’ Nemoto, who mainly practiced with the character and is hence called a "Urien main", was the winner of the Red Bull Kumite 2017 tournament. Commenting on his victory, Nemo was of the view that a Urien player like him should focus on leveraging the character's "enormous comeback potential" to find the opportunity for an opening against their opponent. Although the character has been described by some quarters as being overpowered, Kotaku staff have drawn attention to professional level matches where relatively inexperienced competitors have defeated experienced Urien players using either an underpowered character like F.A.N.G. or a well-practiced counter tactic.

References

External links
  Character Guide 163: Urien on the official Capcom website 
 Urien on the official Street Fighter V website
  SFV: Urien Trailer on the official Street Fighter, YouTube channel

Capcom antagonists
Fictional characters with energy-manipulation abilities
Fictional fratricides
Fictional members of secret societies
Fictional pankration practitioners
Male characters in video games
Male video game villains
Street Fighter characters
Video game characters introduced in 1997
Video game characters with electric or magnetic abilities